The Yauli Province is one of the nine provinces in Peru that form the Junín Region. It is bordered to the north by the Pasco Region and the Junín Province, to the east by the Tarma Province, to the south by the Jauja Province and to the west by the Lima Region. The population of the province was estimated at 66,093 inhabitants in 2002. The capital of the Yauli Province is La Oroya.

Geography 
The Paryaqaqa and Puwaq Hanka mountain ranges traverse the province. Some of the highest mountains of the province are listed below:

Some of the largest lakes of the province are Llaksaqucha, Markapumaqucha, Markaqucha, Pumaqucha, Putkaqucha, P'ukruqucha, Tuqtuqucha, Waqraqucha, Waskhaqucha (Carhuacayan) and  Waskhaqucha (Morococha).

Political division
The Province of Yauli this divided into ten districts:

 Chacapalpa (Chacapalpa)
 Huay-Huay (Huay-Huay)
 La Oroya (La Oroya)
 Marcapomacocha (Marcapomacocha)
 Morococha (Nueva Morococha)
 Paccha (Paccha)
 Santa Barbara de Carhuacayan (Santa Barbara de Carhuacayan)
 Santa Rosa de Sacco (Santa Rosa de Sacco)
 Suitucancha (Suitucancha)
 Yauli (Yauli)

Archaeology 
The archaeological site of Iskuqucha was declared a National Cultural Heritage in 2010.

References

Provinces of the Junín Region